Offgrid is a magazine dedicated to preparation and survival; featuring articles on making knives, building shelters, bug out bags, and gear reviews.

The magazine primarily offers educational articles on how to survive a life-threatening situation or a man-made or natural disaster. Reviews on knives, packs, clothing and survival gear; as well as first aid tips, historical articles, self-defense and foraging. In addition to those departments, each issue has a central theme which unifies the articles.

References

External links
 

Bimonthly magazines published in the United States
Sports magazines published in the United States
Quarterly magazines published in the United States
Firearms magazines
Hunting and fishing magazines
Magazines established in 2013
Magazines published in Los Angeles